Yury Dmitriyev (born 26 August 1946) is a former Soviet cyclist. He competed in the individual road race and the team time trial events at the 1968 Summer Olympics.

References

External links
 

1946 births
Living people
Soviet male cyclists
Olympic cyclists of the Soviet Union
Cyclists at the 1968 Summer Olympics
Sportspeople from Dresden